Feni-1 is a constituency represented in the Jatiya Sangsad (National Parliament) of Bangladesh since 2014 by Shirin Akhter of the Jatiya Samajtantrik Dal.

Boundaries 
The constituency encompasses Chhagalnaiya, Fulgazi, and Parshuram upazilas.

History 
The constituency was created in 1984 from the Noakhali-1 constituency when the former Noakhali District was split into three districts: Feni, Noakhali, and Lakshmipur.

Members of Parliament 
Key

Elections

Elections in the 2010s 
Shirin Akhter was elected unopposed in the 2014 General Election after opposition parties withdrew their candidacies in a boycott of the election.

Elections in the 2000s 

Khaleda Zia stood for five seats in the 2001 general election: Bogra-6, Bogra-7, Khulna-2, Feni-1, and Lakshmipur-2. After winning all five, she chose to represent Bogra-6 and quit the other four, triggering by-elections in them. Sayeed Iskander, her brother, was elected in a November 2001 by-election.

Elections in the 1990s

References

External links
 

Parliamentary constituencies in Bangladesh
Feni District